Basalt Rock Company was a multifaceted industrial operation that was founded in 1920.  The company started as a rock quarrying operation located a few miles south of Napa, California near Rocktram adjacent to the Napa River. It later branched out into the ship building business in 1941 when it started building ships for the U.S. Navy for use during World War II. Following the war, the plant built 30 miles of pipe for the City of Napa's pipeline from Lake Hennessey.

In 1950, the company took title of a cement plant formerly owned by Standard Portland Cement Company in what is now American Canyon, California. The cement plant remained in operation until 1978.  As of 2001, the city was evaluating the plant for future use.

Successor companies of earlier corporate sales
The company's steel making plant was purchased by Kaiser Steel in 1955.  The plant changed hands again in 1988 when it was purchased by Oregon Steel Mills and remained in operation as Napa Pipe until 2004. Developers proposed turning the site into a housing development, but faced strong opposition and controversy over the project.

The rock and sand portion of the company was purchased by Dillingham Construction in the early 1970s.  It was acquired by Syar Industries in 1986, and as of 2018 remains in operation as Syar's Napa Quarry.  In 2013 Syar announced that it was applying for permits to double the output of the quarry from 1 million to 2 million tons of aggregate.

Ships built
Basalt Rock Company ships built for World War 2:

See also
California during World War II
Maritime history of California
Wooden boats of World War 2

References

Defunct mining companies of the United States
Defunct shipbuilding companies of the United States
Mining in California
Steel companies of the United States
Companies based in Napa County, California
American companies established in 1920
Manufacturing companies established in 1920
Non-renewable resource companies established in 1920
Vehicle manufacturing companies established in 1920
Manufacturing companies disestablished in 1978
1920 establishments in California
1978 disestablishments in California
History of Napa County, California
Ships built in Napa, California
American companies disestablished in 1978
Defunct manufacturing companies based in California